Polly-O is an American brand of cheese products, currently owned by BelGioioso Cheese Inc. The original Polly-O manufacturing company had been established in 1899, operating independently until it was acquired by Kraft Foods Inc. in 1986. Kraft owned it until 2020, when it sold its natural cheese division to Groupe Lactalis. In 2021, Groupe Lactalis entered into a purchase agreement with Belgioioso to sell Polly-O, as a requirement by the US Department of Justice's antitrust review of Lactalis's purchase from Kraft Heinz.

Overview 

Polly-O was started by Giuseppe Pollio in Brooklyn in 1899 and bought by Kraft Foods in 1986. Pollio brought his family's traditional cheese-making Italian traditions to America with him. About 100 years ago when Pollio first came to America, he went to Coney Island in Brooklyn, New York and set up his ricotta and mozzarella kettles on the beach after coming through Ellis Island. The Pollio company changed its name to Polly-O in the 1940s to due to the original name's similarity to the polio epidemic.

Polly-O cheese is sold in many US grocery chain stores and is well known for its ricotta, mozzarella, and string cheeses. Most Polly-O cheese is manufactured in Campbell, New York. Polly-O is one of the largest producers of Italian cheeses. This company produces almost one hundred million pounds of cheese each year.  Huffington Post calls the company's string cheese line "a work of art".

References

External links
 
 New York Times interview with Polly-O vice president Mark Pettie, March 8, 1998

Food and drink companies established in 1899
Snack food manufacturers of the United States
1899 establishments in New York City